Colţeşti may refer to several villages in Romania:

 Colţeşti, a village in Rimetea Commune, Alba County
 Colţeşti, a village in Logrești Commune, Gorj County
 Colţeşti, a village in Alunu Commune, Vâlcea County